is a Japanese voice actress from Shizuoka Prefecture who is affiliated with Aksent. She is known for her roles as Michiru Takeda in High School Fleet and Lana in Pokémon the Series: Sun & Moon.

Filmography

Anime
2013
Concrete Revolutio as Chinatsu (episodes 1–2, 11–2), Saki (episode 8)

2016
Show By Rock!! as Maid (episode 2)
High School Fleet as Michiru Takeda
Pokémon the Series: Sun & Moon as Lana
Macross Delta as Lydie LeGrand

2019
Why the Hell are You Here, Teacher!? as Rei Suzuki

2020
Pocket Monsters as Lana (episode 37)

Films
2020
High School Fleet: The Movie as Michiru Takeda

References

External links
Agency profile 

Japanese voice actresses
Ritsumeikan University alumni
Voice actresses from Shizuoka Prefecture
Living people
1987 births